The Saho are a Cushitic ethnic group from Eritrea, and they also inhabit some parts of northern Ethiopia. They speak Saho as a mother tongue.

Society

Ethnicity and societal structure 
According to Abdulkader Saleh Mohammad, most of the Saho (like the Afar and the Somali) have a primordial view of their own ethnicity, and claim to be descended from Arabian immigrants; this in turn allows for an identification with the family of Muhammad, and for an association of their history with that of the Near East. The societal structure is patrilineal and hierarchic, with society vertically organized in tribes and clans and families. The tribe (meela, kisho, or qabila) is organized into sub-tribes (gaysha, harak, or are) or clans (dik or are), but these two concepts are not always clearly distinguished, which are the most important strata because they indicate an individual's "personal descent or origin". Family descent is memorized going back at least 30 or 40 generations. Also memorized and narrated are laws and customs, and consanguinity plays an important role in these traditions, indicating again the primordial quality of tribal and ethnic identity.

Economy 
Most Saho are pastoralists that also engage in some agriculture but a few groups are settled farmers.

Demographics
The total population of the Saho is unclear due to conflicting figures. However, most Saho reside in Eritrea. According to a 2015 estimate, the total population ranges anywhere from 250,000 to 650,000. According to Saho groups, they estimated that the population of Sahos in Eritrea was about 206,000 as of 2016. They represent about 4% of the population of Eritrea as of 2021. A 2012 estimate placed the Saho-speaking population of Ethiopia at 37,000.

According to Ethnologue, there are approximately 220,000 total Saho speakers as of 2015. Most are concentrated in Eritrea with the remainder inhabiting Ethiopia. Within Eritrea, the Saho primarily reside in the Southern and Northern Red Sea regions.

Language
The Saho people speak the Saho language as a mother tongue. It belongs to the Saho-Afar dialect cluster of the Lowland East Cushitic languages, which are part of the Cushitic branch of the Afroasiatic family. and is closely related to Afar and Somali. Many Saho people have mingled with other Muslim tribes such as the Jeberti (Tigrinya-speaking Muslims) and the Tigre and have as a result adopted those tribes languages.

Religion
The Saho are predominantly Muslim. Majority of the Saho had adopted Islam by the 13th century due to the growing influence of holy men and traders from the Arabian peninsula. A few Christians, who are also known as the Irob, live in the Tigray region of Ethiopia and the Debub Region of Eritrea.

Customary law
Regarding the customary law of the Saho, when there is an issue the Saho tend to call for a meeting or conference which they call rahbe. In such a meeting the Saho people discuss how to solve issues related to water, pasture or land, clan disputes and how to alleviate these problems. This is also discussed with neighboring tribes or ethnic groups and sub-clans to reach a consensus.

A skilled representative is chosen for this meeting, this representative is called a madarre. A madarre brings forth arguments to his audience and sub-clans or tribes who are involved and tries to win them over. This is discussed with clan or tribal wise men or elders, ukal. On smaller scale conflicts between 2 individuals, one of the 2 takes their grievances to the ukal, they in turn appoint shimagale or mediators for the dispute.

The Gadafur, who are considered the saintly lineage. When it comes to customary law of the Saho, the Gadafur, who are considered part of the holy families, act as religious leaders and political mediators of the Minifere tribes. The Gadafur have a high status and are highly privileged and respected among the Saho. It is said that the Gadafur are originally from the tribe of Gadabuursi.

References

Notes

Bibliography

External links
List of Saho communities
Saho videos

Ethnic groups in Eritrea
Ethnic groups in Ethiopia
Pastoralists